Christopher Sean Friel (born October 25, 1985) is an American actor known for his role as Paul Narita on the NBC soap opera Days of Our Lives. He previously played Bing Lee in the critically acclaimed web series The Lizzie Bennet Diaries and his recurring role of Gabriel Waincroft on CBS's Hawaii Five-0. Sean also gained recognition for his lead voice over role as Kazuda Xiono in Star Wars Resistance and his recurring role as Brandon on You.

Personal life
Christopher Sean Friel was born on October 25, 1985, in Oak Harbor, Washington to Sayuri and Patrick Friel. He has two sisters, Candis and Melody. Sean grew up mainly in Southern California. Sean is Japanese on his mother's side and Irish, Spanish and German on his father's side.

Sean grew up in the military because his father was in the Navy. When Sean's father was stationed away from home, he put himself on video reading books to his children and Sean's mother would record videos of the kids and reply back. As a result, Sean was always very comfortable in front of the camera and those experiences inspired him to try acting. Growing up, Sean had a big poster of Bruce Lee on his wall and admits there weren't many people for him to relate to in the entertainment industry. Sean speaks Japanese, which he picked up from his parents when his father was assigned to the USS Tripoli. Sean is trained in boxing, Taekwondo, wrestling, Jujutsu and mixed martial arts.

Career
Sean said that he was working at Six Flags Hurricane Harbor in Valencia, California when he was first "discovered." He started doing modeling work, and in 2007 he won the Mr. Asia USA pageant. Sean earned a $1,500 cash prize and a one-year acting class at the Michael John Studio in Van Nuys, California.

Sean revealed that he struggled early on his career due to his mixed ethnicity, saying "I'm not Asian enough to play Asian roles and I'm not white enough to play white roles." He auditioned for ABC's daytime soap opera General Hospital, where he admitted to screwing up the audition due to his lack of experience. Sean has made appearances on Hollywood Heights, The Mindy Project, and the web series The Lizzie Bennet Diaries. In 2014, he began playing the recurring role of Gabriel Waincroft on CBS's Hawaii Five-0.

In October 2014, it was announced that Sean had joined the cast of Days of Our Lives as a contract cast member. His character, pro baseball player Paul Narita, comes out as gay and becomes involved in a love triangle with supercouple Will Horton and Sonny Kiriakis, and is the illegitimate son of longtime character John Black. Sean left the series in 2018, but reprised the role in the 2022 limited-run series Days of Our Lives: Beyond Salem.

Sean voiced lead character Kazuda Xiono in the animated series Star Wars Resistance.

In November 2020, Sean was cast in a recurring role on the third season of the Netflix psychological thriller series You.

Filmography

Video games

References

External links
 

1985 births
21st-century American male actors
American people of German descent
American people of Irish descent
American people of Japanese descent
American people of Spanish descent
American male film actors
American male soap opera actors
American male television actors
Living people
Male actors from Washington (state)